Patrick Ochan    (born December 10, 1990) is a Ugandan  professional footballer who plays as a midfielder for Kyetume FC in the Uganda Super League and for the Uganda national team as a midfielder.

Playing history
Patrick has previously played in Uganda Revenue Authority SC, Saint George FC in Ethiopia, Simba SC in Tanzania, TP Mazembe in Democratic Republic of Congo and currently in  Uganda Revenue Authority SC.: Lapasse Football Club in Seychelles Premier League. Comeback to URA Uganda Revenue Authority SC in 2015-2017, after that he went to Bukavu Dawa in Democratic Republic of Congo in 2017. In September 2018, he joined  Kyetume FC .

International career

Statistics accurate as of match played 10 September 2017

International goals
Scores and results list Uganda's goal tally first.

Honours
Uganda Revenue Authority
Ugandan Super League: 2006–07, 2008–09
Saint George
Ethiopian Premier League: 2008, 2010
TP Mazembe
Linafoot: 2011, 2012, 2013, 2014

Super Coupe du Congo: 2013, 2014
Uganda
CECAFA Cup: 2009, 2011, 2012

References

External links
 
 

1990 births
Living people
Ugandan footballers
Uganda international footballers
Association football midfielders
Expatriate footballers in Tanzania
Ugandan expatriate sportspeople in Tanzania
Simba S.C. players
Saint George S.C. players
Kyetume FC players
Tanzanian Premier League players
People from Gulu District